"If Looks Could Kill" is a song by English alternative rock band Transvision Vamp. It was the second single taken from their third album, Little Magnets Versus the Bubble of Babble (1991), and served as the band's final single. Released on 10 June 1991, the song reached number 41 on the UK Singles Chart and number 38 in New Zealand.

Track listings
7-inch and cassette single 
 "If Looks Could Kill"
 "My Friend the Tom Cat"
 "Puppy Dog Tails"

12-inch single 
A1. "If Looks Could Kill" (Voodoo Hipster mix)
B1. "My Friend the Tom Cat"
B2. "Puppy Dog Tails"
B3. "I Want Your Love" (live)

CD single 
 "If Looks Could Kill" (7-inch version)
 "My Friend the Tom Cat"
 "Puppy Dog Tails"
 "Tell That Girl to Shut Up" (live)

US 12-inch single 
A1. "If Looks Could Kill" (Voodoo Hipster mix)
A2. "If Looks Could Kill" (LP version)
B1. "Twangy Wigout" (12-inch mix)
B2. "My Friend the Tom Cat"
B3. "Puppy Dog Tails"

Charts

References

External links
 Worldwide releases

Transvision Vamp songs
1991 singles
1991 songs
MCA Records singles